Saint Louis Basket Club, better known as simply Saint Louis or SLBC, is a Senegalese basketball club based in Saint-Louis. The team competes in the Nationale 1, the highest national level.

Honours
Nationale 1
Runners-up (2): 2017, 2018
Senegalese Cup
Winners (1): 2019

References

External links
Official Facebook

Basketball teams in Senegal